Jordan Ben Storey (born 2 September 1997) is an English professional footballer who plays as a defender for Preston North End.

He has previously played for Exeter City, and on loan at Bideford, Tiverton Town, and Dorchester Town.

Playing career

Exeter City
Prior to joining the Exeter City Academy, Storey played for South Petherton, Chard Town and Mere Town. He joined Southern League Premier Division side Bideford on a short-term loan in March 2016, before being offered professional terms in May of the same year. He made his first-team debut for Exeter on 30 August 2016, coming on as a 62nd-minute substitute for Pierce Sweeney in a 4–2 defeat at Oxford United in an EFL Trophy group stage match.

Storey joined Southern League Division One South & West side Tiverton Town in March 2017, playing 6 times as they clinched promotion to the Southern League Premier Division. The young defender began the following season on loan at Dorchester Town, playing 13 fixtures before being recalled by Exeter in late October due to an accumulation of injuries to first-team defenders. He made his league debut in a 1–1 draw at Mansfield Town on 28 October 2017, being subbed on in the 94th minute in place of striker Reuben Reid after right-back Kane Wilson was sent off.

Storey's first league start came in a 1–0 defeat to Luton Town at Kenilworth Road on 3 February 2018. The following month, Storey scored his first goal in professional football − a left-footed volley in a 1–0 victory over Port Vale at Vale Park. He made 17 appearances in all competitions scoring 2 goals during the 2017–18 season as he helped Exeter reach the 2018 EFL League Two play-off Final, which they lost on 28 May against Coventry City.

Preston North End
On 12 June 2018, Storey signed for EFL Championship side Preston North End on a four-year contract, moving for a 'substantial undisclosed fee'. On 20th September 2021, Storey signed a 3-year contract extension with the Lilywhites following a strong start to the 2021/2022 season.  

On 19 January 2022, he was sent on loan to Sheffield Wednesday for the remainder of the season. He would make his debut on 29 January, starting the game against Ipswich Town. His first goal of his loan spell would be against Bolton Wanderers on 9 April 2022.

Honours
Exeter City
2017–18: League 2 (Playoff Final : Runner Up)

Statistics

References

1997 births
Living people
People from South Somerset (district)
English footballers
Association football defenders
Chard Town F.C. players
Exeter City F.C. players
Bideford A.F.C. players
Tiverton Town F.C. players
Dorchester Town F.C. players
Preston North End F.C. players
Sheffield Wednesday F.C. players
English Football League players
Southern Football League players